Patricia Larter (1936–1996) was an Australian artist who worked across mail art, video, photography, performance and painting. She was "one of the leading figures in the movement known as 'international mail art'". She is credited with coining the term "femail art" that was taken up by other mail artists around the world.

Life 

Born 8 July 1936 in Leytonstone, Essex Patricia Florence Larter (Née Holmes) the elder of two daughters Pat and her family lived at Canvey Island. Her father died of TB when she was young and her wages were needed to support the family.

Pat met her long time collaborator and husband Richard Larter at Perfect Lambert & Co where they were both employed. They married on 18 February 1953 when Pat was just sixteen and migrated to Australia in 1962. They had five children Lorraine, Nicholas, Derek, Diane and Eliza.

Settling in Luddenham, New South Wales the Larter's stayed until 1982 when they moved to Yass, New South Wales.

Pat died on 6 October 1996, an untimely death from cancer.

Art 

Larter's art aimed to "parody what she described as 'malegiven sexual stereotypes', largely focusing on the ephemeral forms of performance and mail art". She "exchanged art with an enormous range of international artists and represented Australia in all major exhibitions of postal art". "Her collection of mail art (now held in the research library of the AGNSW) is the most comprehensive one accumulated in Australia." "Her foray into painting was brief, interrupted by her death in 1996."

Femail Art’, her "feminist answer to mail art" was taken on by female mail artists worldwide including Anna Banana who used the term "in the title concept of VILE magazine vol. 6, no 3"

Pat and Dick 

Larter features in many of Richard's paintings and is frequently described as his muse. The boundaries between their individual practices often overlap. "Under Pat’s direction, Richard took the photographs of her that she used in her work but he also used those photographs as sources for his paintings. The pair also produced many collaborative super-8 films and prints." Their individual work shares themes and motifs.

In her mail art all correspondence and mailings posted by Larter, that included works made individually or in collaboration, were signed "Pat & Dick" or "Pat and Richard Larter".

Exhibitions

Selected solo exhibitions 

 2015, Femail Art, Mailbox Art Space, Melbourne
 2013 Paintings, Watters Gallery, Sydney
 2011 Paintings, Watters Gallery, Sydney
 2009 Abstract and Figurative Paintings, Legge Gallery, Sydney
 2005 Paintings, Legge Gallery, Sydney 2003 Abstract and Figurative Paintings, Legge Gallery, Sydney
 2002 Paintings, Legge Gallery, Sydney 2001 Paintings (unexhibited work 1992-1994), Legge Gallery, Sydney
 1999 Patricia Larter 1936-1996, Legge Gallery at Watters Gallery, Sydney
 1997 Pat Larter, Legge Gallery, Sydney 1996 Mirror Mirror On The Wall, Legge Gallery, Sydney
 1995 New Paintings and Super Scans With Glitter, Legge Gallery, Sydney 1994 Allusions and Illusions, Legge Gallery, Sydney
 1993 Bedazzled, Legge Gallery, Sydney 1992 Rhapsody in Colour, Legge Gallery, Sydney
 1991 Laser Prints, Manfred Stirnemann Gallery, Zurich, Switzerland
 1986 Mail Art Show, Artists' Union, Osaka, Japan

Selected group exhibitions 

 2015 See You At The Barricades, Art Gallery of New South Wales, Sydney
 2014 Glitter: Pat Larter vs Lola Ryan, Lawrence Wilson Art Gallery, University of Western Australia
 2013 Like Mike, Sarah Scout Presents, Melbourne
 2011 Frank's Flat, Maitland Regional Art Gallery, NSW
 2010 Art Month Sydney, Watters Gallery, Sydney
 2010 Melbourne Art Fair, Royal Exhibition Building, Melbourne
 2010 Summer Exhibition, Watters Gallery, Sydney
 2009 Summer Exhibition, Watters Gallery, Sydney
 2008 Richard Larter: A Retrospective, National Gallery of Australia, Canberra
 2008 Melbourne Art Fair 2008, Royal Exhibition Building, Melbourne
 2007 Summer Show, Legge Gallery, Sydney
 2007 Art Sydney '07, Royal Hall of Industries, Moore Park, Sydney
 2006 Larter Family Values, Travelling exhibition : University of Tasmania Centre for the Arts; Queensland University of Technology & Liverpool Regional Museum
 2006 Group Show, Legge Gallery, Sydney
 2006 Summer Show, Legge Gallery, Sydney
 2006 Melbourne Art Fair 2006, Royal Exhibition Building, Melbourne
 2005 Summer Show, Legge Gallery, Sydney
 2004 Melbourne Art Fair 2004, Royal Exhibition Building, Melbourne
 2003 Summer Show, Legge Gallery, Sydney
 2002 Stripperama: The Work of Richard Larter, Heide Museum of Modern Art, Melbourne
 2002 Melbourne Art Fair 2002, Royal Exhibition Building, Melbourne
 2002 Group Show, Legge Gallery, Sydney
 2002 Summer Show, Legge Gallery, Sydney
 2000 Ten Years , Legge Gallery, Sydney Sixth Australian, Legge Gallery, Sydney
 2000 Summer Exhibition, Legge Gallery, Sydney
 1999 Exploratory Behaviour, National Gallery of Victoria
 1999 10Th Summer Exhibition, Legge Gallery, Sydney
 1998 Christmas Show, Legge Gallery, Sydney
 1997 Sanguine Valediction, Legge Gallery, Sydney
 1996 Mellow Down Easy (Dedicated to Pat Larter), Legge Gallery, Sydney
 1996 5Th Australian Contemporary Art Fair, Royal Exhibition Building, Melbourne
 1996 Richard Larter and Pat Larter Super Scans, Watters Gallery, Sydney
 1996 Adelaide Biennial of Australian Art, Art Gallery of South Australia
 1995 Ironsides, Powerhouse Museum, for Armidale Regional Gallery
 1995 Summer Exhibition, Legge Gallery, Sydney
 1994 Fourth Australian Contemporary Art Fair 2002, Royal Exhibition Building, Melbourne
 1994 Artists Don't Believe in Sanity Clause, Legge Gallery, Sydney
 1993 After the Field..., Utopia Gallery, Sydney After the Field..., Manly Art Gallery, Sydney
 1993 Pat Larter's Rhythms & Peter Maloney's Blues, Rom Gallery, Sydney Tempest, Legge Gallery, Sydney
 1992 Abstract: The Non-objective, MOCA, Brisbane
 1992 Thisness, Legge Gallery, Sydney

Publications

Selected bibliography 

 ACT 1: The Arts Council of Australia, catalogue and publication, November 1978
 Adelaide Biennial of Australian Art, catalogue 1996
 Australian World Theatre Exchange: The Theatre Board of Australia Council,
 Binns, Vivienne: Art & Australia, obituary 1996
 Foster, Ernest : A Public of Individuals, Vol.1 No.2 Sept/Oct 2002
 Gellatly, Kelly: Stripperama, catalogue to exhibition, Heide Museum of Modern Art, Melbourne
 Hart, Deborah : artonview, Issue 54, Winter 2008
 Hart, Deborah : Richard Larter: A Retrospective, National Gallery of Australia publication, 2008
 Heary, Monica: Liverpool Leader, 'Arts or tarts', 22/8/2007
 Heary, Monica: Liverpool Leader, 'Frankly, it's a studnasium', 28/8/2007
 Hynes, Victoria: The Sydney Morning Herald, 'Metro Arts', 5/7/2002
 James, Bruce: Sydney Morning Herald, 'The Picture's in the Mail' mailart review AGNSW archives, 7/8/99
 James, Bruce: Richard Larter: A Retrospective, National Gallery of Australia, Canberra
 Liverpool Leader, 'Larter-day eccentrics live in art', 8/8/2007
 Liverpool City Champion, 'Larter Family Valuest', 1/8/2007
 Lobley, Katrina: The Sydney Morning Herald, 'Larter Family Values, 9/8/2007
 McDonald, John: The Sydney Morning Herald, Obituary, 17/10/1996
 McKenzie, Robyn: The Age, 'A colourful, well-stocked Larter
 Mendelssohn, Joanna: The Australian, 4/8/1995
 Mendelssohn, Joanna: The Australian, 'Joy through Liberated Art' 18/10/1996
 Mendelssohn, Joanna: Art & Australia, 'Exposing Pat Larter' Vol. 42 No.3 2005
 Mendelssohn, Joanna: Larter Family Values, exhibition catalogue, Liverpool City Gallery, 2006
 Mendelssohn, Joanna: Liverpool Leader, 'opiniont' 12/9/2007
 'Muse and partner unveiled': Daily Telegraph, 18/8/2007
 Tarasov, Anne : Liverpool City Champion, 'Larters launch their Art' 8/82007
 Tarasov, Anne : Liverpool City Champion, 'Beholder beware' 22/82007
 Tsoutas, Nicholas: Larter Family Values, exhibition catalogue forward 2006

Collections 

 National Gallery of Australia
 Art Gallery of South Australia
 Art Gallery of New South Wales
 Art Gallery of Western Australia
 Allen Arthur Robinson
 National Gallery of Victoria

See also 

 Australian art

References 

Australian women artists
1936 births
1996 deaths